Ambalavao  is a city (commune urbaine) in Madagascar, in the Haute Matsiatra region. The city is in the most southern part of the Central Highlands, near the city of Fianarantsoa.

Nature
The Anja Community Reserve, situated about 13 km south of Ambalavao, is a small community-based reserve created to preserve and manage local natural resources.
Andringitra National Park is located near this city.

Geography 
Ambalavao is situated at the Route Nationale No. 7 Fianarantsoa-Ihosy-Tuléar at 160 km from Ihosy and 56 km from Fianarantsoa.
An airport serves the town.

Climate 
Ambalavao has a humid subtropical climate (Köppen: Cwa).

Transports 

The city is served by Ambalavao Airport.

See also
 Andringitra National Park
 Anja Community Reserve

Gallery

References

Cities in Madagascar
Populated places in Haute Matsiatra